Holger Hesse (1900–1967) was a German engineer. Together with his partner, Danish anesthetist Henning Ruben, he invented the world's first non-electric, self-inflating resuscitator, the Ambu bag, in 1956.

References

 Life Science Encyclopedia, Bag valve mask
 The Ambu-Resuscitator, British Journal of Anesthesia Volume 35, Number 11 Pp. 748, 
 Henning Ruben MD, 1914–2004, Resuscitation, Volume 64, Issue 3, Pages 253–256, 

Anesthesia
20th-century German inventors
1900 births
1967 deaths